Pedretti is an Italian surname. Notable people with the surname include:

Benoît Pedretti (born 1980), French footballer
Carlo Pedretti (1928–2018), Italian historian
Erica Pedretti (born 1930), Swiss writer and artist
Giuseppe Pedretti (1694–1770), Italian Baroque painter
Mario Pedretti (born 1948), Italian sprint canoeist
Paolo Pedretti (1906–1983), Italian cyclist
Victoria Pedretti (born 1995), American actress

Italian-language surnames
Surnames from given names